The Jeanneau Yachts 60 is a French blue water cruising sailboat. The hull was designed by Philippe Briand, with the interior by Andrew Winch. It was first built in 2021.

Production
The design was built by Jeanneau in France, starting in 2021, and remained in production in 2023.

Design
The Jeanneau Yachts 60 is a recreational keelboat, built predominantly of vacuum-infused fiberglass, with wood trim. It has a fractional sloop with a bowsprit, an over-plumb stem, a slightly reverse transom with a drop-down tailgate-style swimming platform, dual internally mounted spade-type rudders controlled by dual wheels and a fixed "L"-shaped fin keel with a weighted bulb. The mainsheet is mounted on a cockpit arch and there is a dinghy garage aft. It displaces  empty and carries  of cast iron ballast.

The boat is a semi-custom design and as such the company offers a wide range of customization. Options include the interior design, cockpit enclosures, as well as the sail plan. Interiors can be a three cabin layout with three heads or a four cabin layout with four heads.

A typical three cabin layout has sleeping accommodation for five people, with a double island berth in the forward cabin, a "U"-shaped settee and individual seats in the main cabin and two aft cabins, one with a double berth on the starboard side and a single on the port side. The galley is located forward in its own space. A navigation station is in the aft part of the main salon, on the port side. There are three heads, one for each cabin, including one located in the bow for the forward cabin.

Operational history
The boat is supported by an active class club the Jeanneau Owners Network.

In a 2021 review, Adam Cort wrote, "especially interesting is the boat's impressively spacious cockpit layout, which to my eye seems more than a little reminiscent of the catamaran-inspired Jeanneau Sun Loft 47, a monohull purpose-built for the charter trade. Combining the optional arch and hardtop with the boat’s aggressively curved dodger will provide all the sheltered space aft you could ever want, whether on passage or at anchor. A clever step also allows easy access to a swim step/boarding platform that drops down to reveal a substantial tender garage. In keeping with other recent additions to the Jeanneau line, the transition from the cockpit to the side decks is a seamless one."

See also
List of sailing boat types

References

External links

Keelboats
2020s sailboat type designs
Sailing yachts
Sailboat type designs by Philippe Briand
Sailboat type designs by Jeanneau Design Office
Sailboat type designs by Andrew Winch
Sailboat types built by Jeanneau